The Battle of Ghazni took place in 1839

Battle of Ghazni may also refer to:
Battle of Ghazni (998)
Battle of Ghazni (1117)
Battle of Ghazni (1148)
Battle of Ghazni (1151)
Battle of Ghazni (2018)